WPP may refer to:

 WPP plc, a British multinational advertising and public relations company
 WPP domain, a protein domain found in plants
 Wavefront parallel processing, a video coding technique
 White Patriot Party, a former American white supremacist paramilitary political party
 Windows software trace preprocessor
 United States Federal Witness Protection Program
 Woman's Peace Party, an American pacifist organization established in 1915
 World Press Photo, holder of an annual press photography contest